Sundown is a rural locality in the Cassowary Coast Region, Queensland, Australia.

History 
In the 1880s, boats were used transfer goods from Flying Fish Point on the coast along the Johnstone River to Innisfail and beyond. Melanesian men worked on these boats and Sundown is the area where they were at the end of their working day, which gave the locality its name.

Education 
There are no schools in Sundown. The nearest primary schools are in Goondi, Innisfail and Innisfail Estate. The nearest secondary school is in Innisfail Estate.

References 

Cassowary Coast Region
Localities in Queensland